John Oldham (born 24 October 1949) is an English former professional footballer who played in the Football League for Mansfield Town.

References

1949 births
Living people
English footballers
Association football forwards
English Football League players
Mansfield Town F.C. players
Footballers from Nottingham